Maus is a rock band from Iceland, formed in 1993. The band consists of Birgir Örn "Biggi" Steinarsson on vocals and guitar, Daníel "Danni" Þorsteinsson on drums, Eggert Gíslason on bass, and Páll Ragnar "Palli" Pálsson on guitar. Most of their songs are sung in Icelandic, though English versions of some songs have been released, as well as some original songs in English. The band was active releasewise from 1994 to 2004 but still continue to play live. They released five studio albums, a number of singles and a compilation that also featured one new song and an bonus cd featuring unreleased demo's and remixes. The band was very active with live performances in and outside their native country. Abroad their most noticeable gigs where at the CMJ, Summerstage and touring Denmark. While active the band appeared at every Iceland Airwaves music festival including the first one. They were a popular supporting band for foreign bands who would visit Iceland. Those included bands/artists as Coldplay, Blonde Redhead, Ash, Ian Brown, Keane, Modest Mouse, and Placebo. Furthermore, Roger O'Donnell from The Cure has appeared as a guest keyboardist on their album Lof mér að falla að þínu eyra.

In December 2004 Maus went on a hiatus. Band members decided to pursue other interests, academic and otherwise, outside of Iceland. Meanwhile, members were working on several music projects including Fræ (Palli's band), Sometime (Danni's band) and Biggi's solo project. Palli (as Páll Ragnar Pálsson) has become a respected classical composer after receiving his PhD in music from the Estonian Academy of Music and Theatre in Tallinn. Birgir became a screenwriter and won the Icelandic film awards Edda with co-writer and director Baldvin Z for the film Life in a Fishbowl (or Vonarstræti), named after a popular track from Maus's fifth studio album, Musick.

In August 2013 all four members of Maus found themselves living in Reykjavík simultaneously, for the first time since the split. In November the same year they came together to play at a concert celebrating the 20 year birthday of local alternative and rock radio station X977 for a full house at Listasafn Reykjavíkur. The following spring they played at the Aldrei fór ég suður music festival in Ísafjörður. Two festival gigs followed that summer, at the first Secret Solstice festival and at metal festival Eistnaflug.

Early in 2015 the band announced that Maus would be playing gigs that year, including that years "Þjóðhátíð", the decades-old bank-holiday festival in Vestmannaeyjar. The band continues to reform sporadically, after three years of intermission they came together again to play a series of concerts, including the Iceland Airwaves festival, to celebrate the 20 year anniversary of "Lof mér að falla að þínu eyra"

Discography

Allar kenningar heimsins… …og ögn meira (SM49CD) 
released 17 September 1994 on Smekkleysa
 Ósnortinn
 Sár
 Ljósrof
 Líkþrá
 Drukknandi ég
 Fingurgómakviða
 Minn felustaður, minn haus
 Lost
 Leiftursýn

Ghostsongs (163952) 
released 26 October 1995 on Sproti
 Eingyðsvolæði
 Djúpnæturgangan
 Þinn viðhlæjandi og vinur
 Fylgjan
 Himbalagimbala
 Sætabrauðsdagarnir eru búnir
 Fingurgóma kviða
 Brúin
 Flæði
 Slæmur
 Girls on film
 Ótti

Lof Mér Að Falla Að Þínu Eyra (SPROTI002) 
released 4 November 1997 on Sproti
 Síðasta ástin fyrir pólskiptin
 90 kr. perla
 Poppaldin
 Égímeilaðig
 Hreistur og slím
 Ungfrú Orðadrepir
 Kristalnótt
 Halastjarnan rekst á jörðina
 Tvíhöfða erindreki
 Ryðgaður geimgengill

Í þessi sekúndubrot sem ég flýt (SPROTI012) 
released 4 November 1999 on Sproti
 Strengir
 Báturinn minn lekur
 Dramafíkill
 Gefðu eftir (síðasta sjónvarpslagið)
 Gerð úr við
 Allt sem þú lest er lygi
 Kerfisbundin þrá
 Kemur og fer
 Bílveiki
 Maðurinn með járnröddina

How Far Is Too Far? 
released 2000
 How Far Is Too Far (Radio Edit)
 Strings
 Dramajunkie
 How Far Is Too Far (Album Version)

This is a promotional EP featuring English-language versions of "Kerfisbundin þrá" ("How Far Is Too Far?"), "Strengir" ("Strings"), and "Dramafíkill" ("Dramajunkie"). there is also an Enhanced CD portion on the disc featuring the "How Far Is Too Far?" video, a band biography and discography, press photos, and MP3s of three more translated songs: "Ungfrú Orðadrepir" ("Miss Moodbreaker"), "Égímeilaðig" ("Revenge Of The Nerd"), and "Allt sem þú lest er lygi" ("Every Written Word Is A Lie"). This EP does not appear to have been released through a record company, and does not bear a catalog number.

Nánast ólöglegt 
released 15 February 2002 on Tónlyst
 Nánast ólöglegt
 Bás 12
 Nánast ómögulegt (by Curver)

This is a limited edition single that was released by Maus in only 200 numeric copies.  The cover-sleeve was handmade by the band and released in four different color-versions.

Musick (SM104CD)
released 16 June 2003 on Smekkleysa
 A Selfish Need
 Musick
 How Far Is Too Far?
 My Favourite Excuse
 If You Stay…
 Emotional Morsecodes
 Without Caution
 Life In A Fishbowl
 Replacing My Bones
 "The Whole Package"
 Glerhjarta

Maus' first English language album. "How Far Is Too Far?" is a different version than the one released on the How Far Is Too Far? promotional EP.

Tónlyst 1994 - 2004 / Lystaukar 1993 - 2004 (DCD022) 
released 18 October 2004
disc 1: Tónlyst 1994 - 2004
 Skjár
 Ljósrof
 Deepnightwalk
 Song About Fluids
 Égímeilaðig
 90 kr. Perla
 Poppaldinn
 Ungfrú Orðadrepir
 (Inn Í) Kristalnótt
 Allt sem þú lest er lygi
 Dramafíkill
 Kerfisbundin þrá
 Nánast ólöglegt
 Musick
 Life In A Fishbowl
 My Favourite Excuse
 Over Me, Under Me

disc 2: Lystaukar 1993 - 2004
 Liquid Substance (by DeLpHi)
 Aftur, aftur og aftur (by Dáðadrengir)
 Musick (by Quarashi)
 Mín uppáhalds afsökun (by gusGus)
 Maus kynntir
 Ósnortinn
 Fingurgómakviða
 Kemur og fer
 Life In A Fishbowl
 Crawl
 Bláskjár
 Snjókóngur
 Tvíhöfða erindreki
 Þetta er ekki byrjun, bara nýr endir
 Þungur hnífur
 Far á himni
 Beittur trúarbrögðum
 Bás 12

"Deepnightwalk" is an English-language version of "Djúpnæturgangan;" "(Inn Í) Kristalnótt" is an acoustic version of "Kristalnótt." "Liquid Substance" is a remix of "Replacing My Bones;" "Aftur, aftur og aftur" is a remix of "Life In A Fishbowl;" "Musick" is a remix of "Musick;" "Mín uppáhalds afsökun" is a remix of "My Favourite Excuse." Tracks 5-9 on disc 2 are live recordings, and tracks 10-18 are demos.

Videography

1994 
Skjár (Directed by Árni Þór Jónsson and Árni Sveinsson)

1997 
Síðasta ástin fyrir pólskiptin (Directed by Árni Sveinsson)

1999 
Allt sem þú lest er lygi (Directed by Freyr Einarsson)
How Far Is Too Far? (Directed by Reynir Lyngdal)

2003 
Life In A Fishbowl (Directed by Börkur Sigþórsson og Björn Thors)
My Favourite Excuse (Directed by Ragnar Hansson)

2004 
Liquid Substance (Directed by Hlynur Magnússon)
Over Me, Under Me (Directed by Elvar Gunnarsson)

References

External links

 
 Official website

Icelandic alternative rock groups
Musical groups from Reykjavík